Champagnac is a commune in the Charente-Maritime department in the Nouvelle-Aquitaine region in southwestern France.

Geography
The Seugne forms most of the commune's southwestern border.

Population

Personalities
 Régis Messac, author, (Champagnac, 2 August 1893 - near Gross-Rosen or Dora, around 1945) was born in the Champagnac schoolhouse where his maternal grandparents, Jean Gabillaud and his wife Justine taught.

See also
 Communes of the Charente-Maritime department

References

External links

 Official website

Communes of Charente-Maritime
Charente-Maritime communes articles needing translation from French Wikipedia